Stephen James Gallacher (born 1 November 1974) is a Scottish professional golfer who plays on the European Tour.

Early life and amateur career
Gallacher was born in Dechmont, West Lothian and is the nephew of former European Ryder Cup captain Bernard Gallacher and cousin of Sky Sports news presenter Kirsty Gallacher. He won the 1994 European Amateur and a couple of important amateur tournaments in Britain. He played in a victorious Walker Cup side in 1995 and turned professional later that year.

Professional career
Gallacher first played on the European Tour in 1996, but struggled to begin with. In 2000, however, he reached the top hundred on the Order of Merit for the first time, placing 56th. In 2004 he recorded his first win on the tour at the Dunhill Links Championship, which is one of the richest golf tournaments in Europe, and finished the year ranked 15th on the Order of Merit.

In February 2013, Gallacher ended a 201-tournament wait for his second victory on the European Tour, when he won the Omega Dubai Desert Classic by three strokes. He held the lead going into the final round after he shot his best career round of 62 on the European Tour in the third round. Despite two bogeys in his first two holes, Gallacher clinched victory with an eagle on the 16th hole. The win moved Gallacher back into the world's top 100.

The following year, Gallacher defended his title with a one stroke victory at the 2014 Omega Dubai Desert Classic for his third European Tour victory. He is the first golfer to ever successfully defend the title.  Five years after his title defense in Dubai, he won again on the European Tour by claiming the 2019 Hero Indian Open, India's premier event, with a birdie on the 18th at the Gary Player course at the DLF Golf and Country Club near Delhi, India, despite a quadruple-bogey on the 7th.  His son Jack caddied for him during his win in India.

Gallacher was one of the three captain's picks by Paul McGinley for the 2014 Ryder Cup.

In December 2022 Gallacher was announced by Ryder Cup Europe as captain of the 2023 European Junior Ryder Cup team, for the match against United States in Rome, Italy ahead of the 2023 Ryder Cup match.

Amateur wins
1991 Scottish Boys Strokeplay Championship
1992 Scottish Boys Strokeplay Championship, Scottish Amateur Championship
1994 European Amateur, Scottish Youths Amateur Championship
1995 Scottish Amateur Open Stroke Play Championship, Lytham Trophy

Professional wins (5)

European Tour wins (4)

1Co-sanctioned by the Asian Tour

European Tour playoff record (1–2)

Challenge Tour wins (1)

Results in major championships

CUT = missed the half-way cut
"T" = tied

Summary

Most consecutive cuts made – 3 (2013 Open Championship – 2014 Masters)
Longest streak of top-10s – 0

Results in The Players Championship

CUT = missed the halfway cut
"T" indicates a tie for a place

Results in World Golf Championships
Results not in chronological order before 2015.

QF, R16, R32, R64 = Round in which player lost in match play
"T" = Tied
Note that the HSBC Champions did not become a WGC event until 2009.

Team appearances
Amateur
European Boys' Team Championship (representing Scotland): 1992 (winners)
Jacques Léglise Trophy (representing Great Britain & Ireland): 1992 (winners)
European Amateur Team Championship (representing Scotland): 1993 (winners), 1995 (winners)
Eisenhower Trophy (representing Great Britain & Ireland): 1994
Walker Cup (representing Great Britain & Ireland): 1995 (winners)

Professional
World Cup (representing Scotland): 2005, 2011, 2013
Seve Trophy (representing Great Britain & Ireland): 2013
Royal Trophy (representing Europe): 2013 (winners)
EurAsia Cup (representing Europe): 2014
Ryder Cup (representing Europe): 2014 (winners)

See also
2009 European Tour Qualifying School graduates

References

External links

Scottish male golfers
European Tour golfers
Ryder Cup competitors for Europe
Sportspeople from West Lothian
People from Dechmont
1974 births
Living people